Cannon Busters is an American fantasy comic book series by LeSean Thomas, launched in March 2005. An original net animation anime series by Satelight and Yumeta Company was released on Netflix on August 15, 2019.

Publication history
The first issue of the series was due to be published by Com.x in 2003, but moved to Devil's Due in 2004 and was published in 2005. It was well received by critics and fans, but due to a very busy schedule, Thomas had decided to reprint and continue the series as an original graphic novel. The graphic novel was due to come out in 2009 and it was speculated that it would have feature a number of guest artists. However, the graphic novel has long since been put on hold, presumably cancelled in favor of reviving the project as an animated production.

Characters
Focuses on those featured in the anime, which was not intended to be an exact adaptation. As the anime changed some of the characters' names, they will be listed before the original (in the comics).

Main characters
 An outlaw and the youngest wanted criminal in the western regions of Gearbolt, Philly in the anime is easily annoyed by his situation, but eventually likes the presence of S.A.M and Casey. He accompanies Samberry on her journey. Philly is also an immortal being, with all of his fatal injuries adding a number.
 /SamberryA young robot girl who is separated from her owner, Prince Toji. S.A.M. has an optimistic, yet naive outlook and enjoys befriending people. If one of her friends were to be in danger, she transforms into a Cannon Buster.
 /Prince TojiThe young prince of Botica. Cautious, he was separated from his close friend, S.A.M. when his kingdom was under attack. He had to travel with Odin to Gara's Keep, much to his concern.
 /LockA very dark, mysterious man who is in search of the Last Heart which will unlock the secret of Gearbolt, and the power of Mora. After Botica was under attack, he took over the kingdom and killed King Bulgher.
 An alcoholic rōnin who assists Samberry on her journey to find Prince Toji. He is the most level-headed of the group, but would laze around. In the anime, he was believed to be someone after Philly, but later became allies with him, S.A.M. and Casey for some time.
 An abandoned assistant and junk mechanic, with an admiration for flying. Casey is optimistic and passionate, that she enjoys looking into whatever mechanism she can find.
 A Botican soldier. He leads Kelby and the robot soldiers through their journey to Gara's Keep. The kingdom's situation has led him to feeling solemn, looking out for Botica's young prince.

Supporting characters
 She suddenly encountered Kelby and Odin, seen as an attacker. She was spared and allied with the two of them afterwards, joining them on their way out of Botica.
 A member of the Fraternity, she lacks arms and uses floating prosthetics. Dex is sly and sinister. She involves herself in hand-to-hand combat, with her prosthetic hands being able to have claws.
 A robot in the Fraternity. She usually has a cold expression and would involve herself in hand-to-hand combat. She also pilots their airship.
 A robot in the Fraternity. Her quirky look contrasts with her condescending energy. She had to fight against 9ine, until he found out she had beer on hand.
 The ninja of the Fraternity. She is able to make clones of herself, but Odin was able to find her weak spot and punched the emblem on her headwear. She is the only member who does not speak.
 The king of Botica. When Kelby wanted to see the city view, Bulgher worried about his son's whereabouts. He was then approached and held captive by Locke, when his kingdom was under attack.
 A member of the Red Ronin, and a former comrade of 9ine's. It is inferred the two shared feelings towards each other, but their honor and duty keep them going as rōnin.
 /VictoriaThe assistant droid of 12welve, she quickly becomes friends with and dubbed "Victoria" by Casey in episode 21. She mainly accompanied 12welve, but stayed out of a fight between her and 9ine.
 A very mysterious woman who sits in the shadows, she sent various bounty hunters to target Philly the Kid according to his past life experiences. She only appeared in episode 7.
 A child who was said to be left alone by his parents, he seemed innocuous unless he was called "short". However, when Casey helped Philly escape afterwards, he reveals his true colors.

Issues
 Cannon Busters #0 (2004, Udon Comics/Devil's Due)
 Cannon Busters #1 (2005, Udon Comics/Devil's Due)
 Cannon Busters #2 (2005, Udon Comics/Devil's Due)

Animation

In 2014, LeSean Thomas started a crowdfunding drive through Kickstarter for an animated adaptation of Cannon Busters. Helping with the project are Tim Yoon who worked as a producer for shows and films such as The Legend of Korra and Batman: Under the Red Hood, while comic book artist Joe Madureira who assisted with character designs.

A pilot episode was released to backers on July 8, 2016, which would've become the first episode. It featured scratch tracks and an earlier design for S.A.M., where she had straight hair (in a darker shade of yellow) tied into long pigtails. While the pilot was never posted online, snippets of it (along with an earlier version of the theme song) were featured on its first trailer. The last Kickstarter update was posted on June 7, 2018.  As of January 1, 2021, the Kickstarter has not been updated and most rewards remain unfulfilled. Requests for a response have not been answered by any of the parties involved.

On August 2, 2017, it was announced that Cannon Busters would be released on Netflix. It is a 12-episode series. On July 6, 2018, Netflix announced a March 1, 2019 premiere date. However, the series was delayed as it was not included in the Netflix slate for March 2019. On May 30, 2019, British anime distributor Manga Entertainment appointed Reemsborko Ltd as the worldwide agent for Cannon Busters and that the series would be released on Netflix in late 2019. The series was released on Netflix on August 15, 2019.  The 12-episode series was directed and written by LeSean Thomas, with Matt Wayne, Natasha Allegri, Anne Toole, Sib Ventress, Martin Pasko, and Nilah Magruder writing scripts alongside Thomas.

Takahiro Natori debuted as a director with the series with LeSean Thomas himself acting as chief director; character designs were handled by Tetsuya Kumagi, and the series featured music composed by Bradley Denniston and Kevin Begg. Satelight and Yumeta Company produced and co-animated the series.

In mid-December 2020, Sony Music released the series' soundtrack.

On February 16, 2021, Funimation announced they acquired the home video rights to the anime series. It was released on DVD and Blu-ray on May 18, 2021.

See also
 List of Devil's Due Publishing publications

References

External links
  at Netflix
 
 

2005 comics debuts
2019 anime ONAs
Anime based on comics
Funimation
Japanese-language Netflix original programming
Netflix original anime
Satelight
Television shows based on comics
Yumeta Company
Original English-language manga